Brachycara is a genus of flies in the family Stratiomyidae.

Species
Brachycara advena (Walker, 1851)
Brachycara digitata James, 1966
Brachycara grandis James, 1962
Brachycara latifrons James, 1960
Brachycara maculata (James, 1953)
Brachycara slossonae (Johnson, 1913)
Brachycara thomsoni Bezzi, 1928
Brachycara ventralis Thomson, 1869

References

Stratiomyidae
Brachycera genera
Taxa named by Carl Gustaf Thomson
Diptera of Asia
Diptera of Australasia
Diptera of North America
Diptera of South America